Koumba Cissé (born 4 June 1991) is a French handball player. She plays for the club Chambray Touraine Handball, and on the French national team. She represented France at the 2013 World Women's Handball Championship in Serbia.

References

French female handball players
1991 births
Living people
Sportspeople from Pontoise